The 2022 Salzburg Open was a professional tennis tournament played on outdoor clay courts. It was the second edition of the tournament which was part of the 2022 ATP Challenger Tour. It took place in Anif (Salzburg), Austria between 4 and 10 July 2022.

Singles main draw entrants

Seeds

 1 Rankings are as of 27 June 2022.

Other entrants
The following players received wildcards into the singles main draw:
  Lukas Neumayer
  Dominic Thiem
  Fernando Verdasco

The following player received entry into the singles main draw using a protected ranking:
  Sebastian Ofner

The following player received entry into the singles main draw as a special exempt:
  Hamad Međedović

The following player received entry into the singles main draw as an alternate:
  Andrea Arnaboldi

The following players received entry from the qualifying draw:
  Facundo Díaz Acosta
  Ivan Gakhov
  Lucas Miedler
  Filip Misolic
  Maximilian Neuchrist
  Vitaliy Sachko

The following player received entry as a lucky loser:
  Pol Martín Tiffon

Champions

Singles

  Thiago Monteiro def.  Norbert Gombos 6–3, 7–6(7–2).

Doubles

  Nathaniel Lammons /  Jackson Withrow def.  Alexander Erler /  Lucas Miedler 7–5, 5–7, [11–9].

References

Salzburg Open
2022 in Austrian sport
July 2022 sports events in Austria